The Wraith: Hell's Pit is the ninth studio album by Insane Clown Posse. Released on August 31, 2004, the album is the final chapter of the first Joker's Card series. It is the second album for the 6th Joker Card in the 1st deck, and the group's 19th overall release.

History
Following the release of The Wraith: Shangri-La, group member Violent J admitted that he was considering not completing the production of Hell's Pit. He is quoted as describing Shangri-La as "the end of the road. It's the end of the Joker's Cards. After this I could do anything I want, for the rest of my life. The positivity was so unbelievable."

Music

Production
Preceding the release of Hell's Pit, Bruce stated the album's sound was intended as a throwback to the minimalistic sound of Carnival of Carnage, particularly its darker second half. Bruce also stated that it would contain less rock elements and singing, and that it would not feature guest appearances. "Bowling Balls" samples the drum beat of Madonna's "Justify My Love," which was based upon Public Enemy's instrumental "Security of the First World", which was in turn based on the end drum break of James Brown's "Funky Drummer".

Lyrical themes
Hell's Pit is the second part of the sixth Joker's Card, The Wraith, written with the opposite intent of its counterpart, Shangri-La, Hell's Pit is intended to illustrate the horrors of hell itself. Many of the songs feature Violent J and Shaggy 2 Dope fictitiously dying, to be sent to Hell, depicted in the album as a place void of all hope and peace, where those who do not atone for their sins and follow the ways of Shangri-La will presumably be sent upon their death. Bruce described the album as "Horror tale after Horror tale, mixed in with songs that describe hell" and stated that it was the darkest, most painful work he had ever done.

Release
Two versions of the album were released, each containing a different DVD. One release featured a live concert and a twelve-minute music video for the song "Real Underground Baby", and another featured a short 3-D film for the song "Bowling Balls", shot in high-definition video.

Reception

The album peaked at #1 on the Billboard Top Independent Albums chart, #12 on the Top Internet Albums Chart, and #12 on the Billboard 200.

Critic Steve 'Flash' Juon of Rap Reviews wrote that "Hell's Pit may be  named, if only because I felt like I was in a burning pit of Hell in my ears while listening to it. Actually, that might be preferable to ever playing this album again." Of the album's conclusion to the Dark Carnival storyline, Allmusic reviewer David Jeffries wrote that "Insane Clown Posse sound tired of the concept, only getting inspired when they've moved on from it".

Legacy
In 2017, it was announced that ICP would perform the album in its entirety at the 2018 Gathering of the Juggalos.

On July 13, 2018, ICP announced that in preparation for the 2018 Gathering of the Juggalos, they had found nine "lost Violent J recordings from the Hell's Pit recording sessions" and would release them as an EP on the day of the Hell's Pit show, and titled it Hell's Cellar. During ICP's seminar, they announced that they found 13 songs all together, but decided to release nine then and the rest on the 20th anniversary edition.

Track listing

Hell's Cellar

Charts

References

2004 albums
Albums produced by Esham
Hell in popular culture
Insane Clown Posse albums
Psychopathic Records albums
Horrorcore albums